The Point of Ayr Lighthouse, also known as the Talacre Lighthouse, is a Grade II listed building situated on the north coast of Wales, on the Point of Ayr, near the village of Talacre.

It was built in 1776 by a Trust of the Major, Recorder and Aldermen of Chester to warn ships entering between the Dee and the Mersey Estuary. It was replaced by a pile light and was decommissioned in 1844. It is now a privately owned property.

Ownership 
The lighthouse was listed on the property market in November 2011 by then owner James McAllister, along with two acres of land, for £100,000. It was eventually sold in April 2012 for £90,000 to a private couple who continue to own the property.

Paranormal activity 
Two alleged incidents have been reported by Wales Online.

The Keeper

In August 2009, the BBC reported that planning permission had been sought to erect a "human sculpture" inspired by the reported ghostly sightings on the lighthouse balcony. This application was made by then owner James McAllister who intended it to serve as a "serious art installation".

Local artist Angela Smith was contracted to design the 7 foot stainless steel ‘lighthouse keeper’ with the initial planning permission being approved for a three-year period. Permission was not sought to retain the structure after this point and the sculpture was relocated.

Damage 
In March 2007, the lighthouse was damaged by storms which resulted in the metal steps leading to the building becoming dislocated and also resulted structural damage with a hole being created in the base according to the BBC.

The cost of repairs was covered by the owners of a local caravan park who were involved in the ownership of the Lighthouse at the time.

TV advertisements 
The lighthouse featured in the background in a 2011 TV advertisement by paint manufacturer Dulux. The advertisement was designed to mark the 50th anniversary of the first appearance of their Old English Sheepdog mascot.

See also

 List of lighthouses in Wales

References

Lighthouses in Wales
Grade II listed buildings in Flintshire
Reportedly haunted locations in Wales
Lighthouses completed in 1776
Towers completed in 1776
Grade II listed lighthouses